HD 35184 is a solitary star in the southern circumpolar constellation Mensa. It has an apparent magnitude of 6.50, which the maximum naked eye visibility.

HD 35184 has a stellar classification of A6 V, indicating that it is an ordinary A-type main-sequence star. At present it has 2.15 times the mass of the Sun and 2.8 times the radius of the Sun. HD 35184 is 674 million years old – 79.6% through its main sequence lifetime – and spins with a projected rotational velocity of 92 km/s−1.

Reference

Mensa (constellation)
A-type main-sequence stars
035184
024507
Mensae, 22
PD-73 294